Historically, a comparison of the tiger (Panthera tigris) versus the lion (Panthera leo) has been a popular topic of discussion by hunters, naturalists, artists and poets, and has inspired the popular imagination. In the past, lions and tigers reportedly competed in the wilderness, where their ranges overlapped in Eurasia. The most common reported circumstance of their meeting is in captivity, either deliberately or by accident.

Opinions 
In general, the lion is a social animal, while the tiger is solitary, though at times, male lions are separate from the females, and tigers socialise, usually for mating, and rarely for hunts. There are differing scenarios regarding whether tigers would beat lions in fights, or vice-versa:

Favoring the tiger 
 Craig Saffoe, a biologist and the curator of great cats at the National Zoological Park in Washington, D.C., said that the outcome of a given fight totally depended on the individuals, with their fighting style, physiology and history, but that he would bet on the tiger winning. He also reckoned that in a fight, the biggest tigers, jaguars and would come out on top against the likes of cougars, snow leopards, leopards, and cheetahs. Saffoe added that the most interesting match-up in his opinion might be between good-sized Bengal tigers and male jaguars, as both had roughly the same speed, temperament, size and strength.

Favoring the lion 
 Dave Hoover, the animal trainer for Clyde Beatty-Cole Brothers Circus, mentions that he lost many tigers to male lions: "I have to keep the male lions from killing each other. I have to keep them from killing the tigers [...]. I have lost tigers." Hoover had lions ganging up on his tigers: "Two lions killed one of his tigers during training in Ojus, Fla., in 1966", and in another newspaper Hoover states he has trouble "keeping the lion from attacking the lone tiger".

Coexistence in the Eurasian wilderness 
According to Colin Tudge (2011), given that both cats hunt large herbivores, it is likely that they had been in competition in Asia. Despite their social nature, lions might have competed with tigers one-against-one, as they would with each other. Apart from the possibility of competition, there are legends of Asiatic lions and tigers breeding to produce hybrid offspring, which would be ligers or tigons. From the fossil record, besides genetics, it would appear that the modern lion and tiger were present in Eurasia since the Pleistocene, when now-extinct relatives also existed there. Additionally, in the days before Indian Independence, the Maharaja of Gwalior introduced African lions into his area, which is a habitat for Bengal tigers.

Asiatic lion and Bengal tiger 
As of the 21st century, India is the only country to have both wild lions and tigers, specifically Asiatic lions and Bengal tigers. Although they do not share the same territory as they did in the past, there is a project which could lead to their meeting in the wilderness.

The possibility of conflict between lions and tigers had been raised in relation to India's Asiatic Lion Reintroduction Project, which was meant to introduce the lions of Gir Forest in the State of Gujarat, to another reserve which is considered to be within the former range of the lion, that is Kuno Wildlife Sanctuary in Madhya Pradesh, before December 2017. Kuno was reported to contain some tigers that came from Ranthambore National Park, including one called 'T-38'. Concerns were raised that the co-presence of lions and tigers would "trigger frequent clashes". At the same, the American biologist Craig Packer and his students at the University of Minnesota considered that a group of lions (two to three males) would have a clear advantage over a tiger and a pack of lionesses (two to four females) would have a similar advantage over a tigress, despite the general advantage of the latter in weight or height. Coalitions of male lions usually fight as a group against territorial rivals, so he mentions that a tiger may have an advantage in a one-on-one encounter, but they also considered that the additional fighting experience and mane perhaps confer an advantage to a lone male lion since the tiger's fighting style evolved in the absence of a mane. Despite all of this, Craig Packer is of the opinion that for Asiatic lions to survive in an area with Bengal tigers, the lions would have to be moved there as intact groups rather than as individuals. Although the habitats of Indian lions and tigers are similar means that they both live in conditions that favour solitary hunters of prey, these lions are social like their African relatives, and may form fighting groups, whereas tigers are usually solitary.

The tiger reserves of Ranthambhore and Sariska in Rajasthan, Gir Forest and Kuno-Palpur are all located in the ecoregion of Khathiar–Gir dry deciduous forests. In early 2019, a tiger trekked from Madhya Pradesh to Gujarat, before apparently dying there of starvation. Otherwise, in Gujarat is the Dangs' Forest, which is a potential habit of the tiger.

Reginald Innes Pocock (1939) mentioned that some people had the opinion that the tiger played a role in the near-extinction of the Indian lion, but he dismissed this view as 'fanciful'. According to him, there was evidence that tigers inhabited the Indian Subcontinent before lions. The tigers likely entered Northern India from the eastern end of the Himalayas, through Burma, and started spreading throughout the area, before the lions likely entered Northern India from Balochistan or Persia, and spread to places like the Bengal and the Nerbudda River. Because of that, before the presence of man could limit the spread of lions, tigers reached parts of India that lions did not reach. However, the presence of tigers throughout India did not stop the spread of lions there, in the first place, so Pocock said that it is unlikely that Bengal tigers played a role, significant or subordinate, in the near-extinction of the Indian lion, rather, that man was responsible for it, as was the case with the decline in tigers' numbers. As such, Pocock thought that it was unlikely that serious competition between them regularly occurred, and that even if Indian lions and tigers met, the chance that they would fight for survival was as good as the chance that they would choose to avoid each other, and that their chances of success, if they were to clash, were as good as each other's.

Asiatic lion and Caspian tiger 
Before the end of the 20th century, Asiatic lions and Caspian tigers had occurred in other Asian or Eurasian nations, including Iran. As such, there is a word for 'Lion', which can also mean 'Tiger', and is used in Iran, South Asia and other areas, that is Sher or Shir, and its significance is discussed below. Not only did Heptner and Sludskiy talk about the lion and tiger both occurring in places like Iran, Anatolia and Transcaucasia, they also mentioned that the ranges of the lion and tiger often overlapped, occurring in riverine habitats which were abundant in prey like deer and wild boar.

Observed fights 
In the circuses of ancient Rome, exotic beasts were commonly pitted against each other, including Barbary lions and tigers. A mosaic in the House of the Faun in Pompeii shows a fight between a lion and a tiger. There are different accounts of which of these animals gained the victory. Although lions and tigers can be kept together in harmony in captivity, fatal conflicts have also been recorded.

In addition to historical recordings, clashes between lions and tigers were reported or even caught on camera in the 19th and 20th centuries. It was not always clear which species regularly beat the other, according to Craig Packer (2015).

In captivity 

 In 1830, a tiger attacked a lion at a menagerie in Turin, Rome. Despite having been caught by surprise, the lion maneuvered the tiger onto its back and clamped fatal jaws on its throat.
 In 1911, Frank Bostock gave an account of a lion killing a tiger.
 In 1934, a fully grown African lion killed a mature Bengal tiger a short time after these circus animals were unloaded from the train and before trainers could separate them.
 In 1937, a vigorous lion and tiger fought in a German zoo, the lion died as a result.
 3 June 1949, in Fitchburg when the Biller Brothers circus moved on to its next stop, it left behind the remains of a 1000 pound tiger. The tiger was killed the night before in a savage battle with a lion.
 At the South Perth Zoo in 1949, in a three-minute fight between a lion and a tiger, the lion killed the tiger. The fight occurred when the tiger put his head through a connecting slide. The lion caught the tiger by the throat, and, dragging it through the opening, killed it before the keepers arrived.
 In 1956, Roman Proske's black maned lion, Achmed jumped onto the back of a tiger though one of the trainers intervened by a fork hitting the lion, the tiger ended up killing the lion by a single bite.
 In 1959, the Maharaja of Gwalior experimented if lions could thrive in India despite their decline, the lions used were African specimens and defined as fine. After a single day the male lion was killed from a fight of one of the tigers, the previous pair of lions having already left the area by the time of the lion's death
 In September 2010, a Bengal tiger at the Ankara Zoo passed through a gap, between its cage and that of a lion, and killed it with a single paw swipe. "The tiger severed the lion's jugular vein in a single stroke with its paw, leaving the animal dying in a pool of blood," officials said. The tiger was also said to previously injured the lion a year before. However, despite being reported in local news at the time, the incident was reported in international media only in March 2011.

Arts and literature

Art 
Battles between the two were painted in the 18th and 19th centuries by Eugène Delacroix, George Stubbs and James Ward. James Ward's paintings portrayed lion victories in accordance with the lion's symbolic value in Britain, and have been described as less realistic than Stubbs.

The British Seringapatam medal shows a lion defeating a tiger in battle; the medal commemorated the British victory at the 1799 Battle of Seringapatam (in the town now known as Srirangapatna in India) over Tipu Sultan—who used tigers as emblems, as opposed to the British emblematic use of lions.

Literature 
In the Hindu epic Mahabharata, Narada told Srinjaya that tigers were fiercer and more ruthless than lions. Vedic literature depicted the lion, rather than the tiger, as the "king of the forest".

The 15th-century book Anvâr-i Suhaylî ("Lights of the Canopus") talks about the lion and the tiger competing for dominance on the banks of the Tigris River, in the vicinity of Basrah.

See also 
 Cat Family
 Big cat
 List of largest cats
 Genus Panthera
 Lion-baiting

 Populations or subspecies of lions
 Northern lions
 Asiatic lion
 Barbary lion
 Southern lions
 Cape lion
 European lions
 Populations or subspecies of tigers
 Mainland Asian populations
 Bengal tiger
 Caspian tiger
 Indochinese tiger
 Malayan tiger
 Siberian tiger
 South China tiger
 Sunda island populations
 Bali tiger
 Bornean tiger
 Javan tiger
 Sumatran tiger

References

Further reading 
 

Lions in popular culture
Tigers in popular culture
Scientific comparisons